Ragnar Rommetveit (11 July 1924 – 11 June 2017) was a Norwegian psychologist.

He was born in Stord. Rommetveit graduated as dr.philos. from the University of Oslo in 1953, with the thesis Social Norms and Roles. He was appointed professor at the University of Oslo from 1959 to 1994. His textbook Språk, Tanke og Kommunikasjon from 1970 has been used for decades in Norway as an introductory book in language psychology. He is a fellow of the Norwegian Academy of Science and Letters.

References

1924 births
2017 deaths
Members of the Norwegian Academy of Science and Letters
Norwegian psychologists
People from Stord
University of Oslo alumni
Academic staff of the University of Oslo